The Teodoro Martinez House, near Los Ojos, New Mexico, was built around 1900.  It was listed on the National Register of Historic Places in 1985.  The listing included two contributing buildings.

The house is significant as an "excellent, well-preserved example of local folk architecture."

A hewn horizontal log shed is the second historic structure of the property;  its logs may have been obtained from Fort Lowell.

References

		
National Register of Historic Places in Rio Arriba County, New Mexico
Houses completed in 1900
Log buildings and structures